Caloundra is a coastal suburb and the central business district of the town of Caloundra in the Sunshine Coast Region, Queensland, Australia.

Geography 
Bulcock Street is the central business district of the Caloundra urban centre.

History 
The suburb takes its name from the headland Caloundra Head (in the neighbouring suburb of Kings Beach), which in turn comes from the Kabi language words "kal/owen" meaning beech tree (Gmelina leichhardtii) and "dha" meaning place.

In 1883 the first allotments of land in Caloundra were advertised for public auction on 28 August 1883. The map states 'the land is of a sandstone nature, undulating and ridgy, heavily timbered with Gum, Bloodwood, Tea-tree and Oak'. A 1907 map shows several sections from George Street to Ernest St advertised for auction on 7 January 1907 by the Government Land Office.

404 allotments of 'Bulcock Estate' were advertised for auction on 16 August 1917 by Isle, Love and Co, auctioneers, with an edge of the Estate mapped as adjacent to Tripcony's store and the Tramway terminus.

In 1919, 29 subdivided allotments of 'Caloundra Heads Estate' were advertised to be auctioned on 20 December 1919 by Cameron Bros. in Brisbane. A map advertising the auction shows the majority of blocks were on Albert Street between King Street and King's Beach. Another undated map shows more blocks of this estate were advertised for auction on King Street towards Ernest Street.

Caloundra Provisional School opened on 8 March 1899 and became Caloundra State School on 1 June 1912.

Caloundra State High School opened on 23 January 1967.

Our Lady of the Rosary School opened on 29 January 1980 by the Roman Catholic teaching order, the Sisters of St Joseph of the Sacred Heart.

The Sir Francis Nicklin Memorial Uniting Church was officially opened on Saturday 20 September 1980 by Mike Ahern, the Member of the Queensland Legislative Assembly for Landsborough. It commemorates former Queensland Premier, Frank Nicklin, who was previously the Member for Landsborough.

Caloundra Christian College opened on 2 February 1983 by the Caloundra CityLife Baptist Church, which meets for worship at the college.

Heritage listings 
The suburb of Caloundra has a number of heritage-listed sites, including:
 Bowman Road: Tripcony Hibiscus Caravan Park

Education
Caloundra State School is a government primary (Prep–6) school for boys and girls at 56A Queen Street. In 2017, the school had an enrolment of 608 students with 45 teachers (36 full-time equivalent) and 25 non-teaching staff (17 full-time equivalent). It includes a special education program.

Caloundra State High School is a government secondary (7–12) school for boys and girls at 88 Queen Street. In 2017, the school had an enrolment of 1209 students with 95 teachers (84 full-time equivalent) and 47 non-teaching staff (33 full-time equivalent). It includes a special education program.

Our Lady of the Rosary School is a Catholic primary (Prep–6) school for boys and girls at Alfred Street. In 2017, the school had an enrolment of 313 students with 22 teachers (19 full-time equivalent) and 14 non-teaching staff (8 full-time equivalent).

Caloundra Christian College is a private primary and secondary (Prep–12) school for boys and girls at 7 Gregson Place. In 2017, the school had an enrolment of 330 students with 31 teachers (27 full-time equivalent) and 25 non-teaching staff (17 full-time equivalent).

Caloundra is also home to a campus of the Sunshine Coast Institute of TAFE.

Amenities
Caloundra Uniting Church is at 56c Queen Street. It is also known as the Sir Francis Nicklin Memorial Uniting Church.

Shopping
 Stockland Caloundra
 Caloundra Village Shopping Centre

Parks and recreation
 Ben Bennett Botanical Park
 Bicentennial Park
  (patrolled by Ithaca–Caloundra City Life Saving Club) and Clarke Place Park
 Central Park (includes Caloundra Tennis Centre, which hosts the Caloundra International)
 Lighthouse Park
 Roy Henzell Park

Other facilities
 Caloundra Hospital
 Caloundra bus station
 Caloundra Golf Club
 Council service centre for Sunshine Coast Region
 A range of accommodation from backpackers to resort hotels

References

External links

 
 

Suburbs of the Sunshine Coast Region
Caloundra
Coastline of Queensland